Vincent Desjardins (born March 12, 1995) is a professional Canadian football defensive lineman for the Montreal Alouettes of the Canadian Football League (CFL). He played college football at Université Laval, and has also been a member of the Calgary Stampeders.

University career 
Desjardins played U Sports football for the Laval Rouge et Or from 2015 to 2018. In his second season, in 2016, he was named a First Team U Sports All-Canadian and ended as a Vanier Cup champion after the Laval Rouge et Or defeated the Calgary Dinos in the 52nd Vanier Cup. In 2017, he was again named a First Team All-Canadian, but ended his season with a loss in the 53rd Vanier Cup to the Western Mustangs. In his final year, in 2018, he was named a First Team All-Canadian for the third time and won his second national championship after the Rouge et Or won the 54th Vanier Cup. Desjardins finished his university career having played in 25 regular season games and recorded 51 tackles, including 25 tackles for loss, 11.5 sacks, four forced fumbles, and one fumble recovery.

Professional career

Calgary Stampeders 
After becoming eligible for the 2019 CFL Draft, Desjardins was drafted in the second round, 17th overall, by the Calgary Stampeders and signed with the team on May 13, 2019. Following training camp in 2019, he made the team's roster, initially as a reserve, and then made his professional debut on June 29, 2019, against the BC Lions. Desjardins dressed in 11 regular season games where he recorded one forced fumble. He made his post-season debut that year in the West Semi-Final, but the Stampeders lost to the Winnipeg Blue Bombers.

Desjardins did not play in 2020 due to the cancellation of the 2020 CFL season. In 2021, he played in nine regular season games where he recorded the first three defensive tackles of his career. He became a free agent upon the expiry of his rookie contract on February 8, 2022.

Montreal Alouettes 
On February 11, 2022, Desjardins signed with the Montreal Alouettes to a one-year contract. He played in four regular season games and had one defensive tackle while spending the rest of the season on the practice roster. He also played in both post-season games that year, but did not record any statistics. Desjardins re-signed with the Alouettes on February 21, 2023.

References

External links 
Montreal Alouettes bio

1995 births
Living people
Calgary Stampeders players
Canadian football defensive linemen
Laval Rouge et Or football players
Montreal Alouettes players
Players of Canadian football from Quebec
Sportspeople from Quebec City